Music in Our Schools is a 1953 Australian documentary directed by Ken G. Hall. It was made for the Department of Education and looks at the use of music in schools.

References

External links

Music in Our Schools at National Film and Sound Archive

Films directed by Ken G. Hall
1950s educational films
1953 films
Australian documentary films
1953 documentary films
Australian black-and-white films
1950s English-language films